The Asia Indigenous Peoples Pact (AIPP) is a regional organization founded in 1992 by indigenous peoples’ movements. AIPP promotes and defend indigenous peoples’ human rights, including land rights and cultural rights.

 AIPP has 47 member organizations from 14 countries in Asia. Some members are focused on women's rights or youth. Members include the Nepal Federation of Indigenous Nationalities, Indigenous Peoples' Alliance of the Archipelago (AMAN) and the Ainu Peoples Council.

Most governments in Asia are signatory to the United Nations Declaration on the Rights of Indigenous Peoples, though indigenous peoples are not recognized in some countries where AIPP has members, such as Laos.

AIPP is accredited with international institutions including the United Nations Economic and Social Council, United Nations Framework Convention on Climate Change, Green Climate Fund, United Nations Environment Programme and World Intellectual Property Organization. AIPP has also coauthored research with the FAO.

References

Indigenous rights organizations
Organizations established in 1988